The Systemic Risk Centre (SRC) is a research centre in London,  hosted at the London School of Economics and dedicated to the study of systemic risk  and the development of policies for addressing the effects of financial crises.

The SRC is funded by the Economic and Social Research Council (ESRC) and was founded in 2012. Its funding was renewed for another five years in 2018.

The SRC  finds that the underlying driver of financial crisis is endogenous risk, described in the SRC Magazine.

Organization  

The SRC  has two directors,  Jon Danielsson and  Jean-Pierre Zigrand,   staff of eight researchers and faculty from the London School of Economics (LSE) and the University College London (UCL).

Research  

The Centre's main research activities are divided into four different areas:
 Endogenous Risk 
 Amplification Mechanisms 
 Policy Responses 
 Identifying Risk

SRC Research is disseminated through events, workshops, seminars and published materials – in particular, through a discussion paper series,  an events  programme and System Risk's youtube channel. The SRC organized a joint event with the International Monetary Fund on Macroprudential Stress Test and Policies: A Framework. SRC director Jean-Pierre Zigrand was  appointed in April 2017 as the UK head of global financial research project to analyse high frequency financial data.

References

External links 
 Official Website
 SRC Magazine

Economic research institutes